Are You Satisfied? is the debut album of English punk duo Slaves. It was released on 1 June 2015. It reached number 8 in its first week on the UK Albums Chart. The album was nominated for the 2015 Mercury Music Prize.  A deluxe edition was released on 13 November 2015 which featured their single "Where's Your Car Debbie" and one of its B-sides, 3 songs from their "Sugar Coated Bitter Truth" EP, 2 tracks from BBC Radio 1's Live Lounge and other new songs.

Reception 

The album received positive reviews from critics, racking up an average rating of 71/00 on Metacritic. Clash Music reviewed their debut album, calling it a "solid debut" and rating it seven out of ten, however, Crack placed the album at number 1 in their list of the worst albums of 2015, and described the duo as "papier-mache punks with their mockney lip-flapping, fag-paper-thin-sentiment, derivative riffs, embarrassingly prescriptive pseudo-politics and sixth form poetry."

Track listing

Personnel
Adapted from the albums liner notes.

 Isaac Holman – vocals, drums; piano on "Are You Satisfied?"
 Laurie Vincent – guitar, synths, backing vocals
 Jolyon Thomas – synths, additional percussion

Charts

References

2015 debut albums
Soft Play albums
Virgin EMI Records albums